Fnaidek, Fnaydeq, is a village in Akkar Governorate, Lebanon. Its inhabitants are ¨ Sunni Muslims.

History

References

Bibliography

External links
 Fnaydeq,  Localiban

Populated places in Akkar District
Sunni Muslim communities in Lebanon